The two main types of bell tower in Japan
It can also be found at some Shinto shrines which used to function as temples (see article Shinbutsu shūgō), as for example Nikkō Tōshō-gū.

History
During the Nara period (710–794), immediately after the arrival of Buddhism in Japan bell towers were 3 x 2 bay, 2 storied buildings. A typical temple garan had normally two, one to the left and one to the right of the kyōzō (or kyō-dō), the sūtra repository. An extant example of this style is Hōryū-ji's Sai-in Shōrō in Nara (see photo in the gallery).

During the following Heian period (794–1185) was developed a new style called hakamagoshi which consisted of a two storied, hourglass-shaped building with the bell hanging from the second story. The earliest extant example is Hōryū-ji's Tō-in Shōrō (see photo in the gallery).

Finally, during the 13th century the fukihanachi type was created at Tōdai-ji by making all structural parts visible. The bell tower in this case usually consists of a 1-ken wide, 1-ken high structure with no walls and having the bell at its center (see photo above). Sometimes the four pillars have an inward inclination called . After the Nara period, in which temple layout was rigidly prescribed after the Chinese fashion, the position of the bell tower stopped being prescribed and began to change temple by temple.

Gallery

See also
 Glossary of Shinto

References

Japanese architectural features
Japanese Buddhist architecture
Bell towers
Shinto architecture
Traditional East Asian Architecture